Göller is a village in the Üzümlü District, Erzincan Province, Turkey. The village is populated by Kurds of the Bamasur, Botikan and Kurêşan tribes and had a population of 98 in 2021.

References 

Villages in Üzümlü District
Kurdish settlements in Erzincan Province